The Other Side of Me may refer to:
The Other Side of Me (Andy Williams album) or the title track, 1975
"The Other Side of Me" (Neil Sedaka song), a 1976 song by Andy Williams
The Other Side of Me, a 2008 album by Linda Eder
"The Other Side of Me", a song from the album Hannah Montana by Miley Cyrus
The Other Side of Me, a 2011 album by Enric Sifa
The Other Side of Me (book), an autobiography by Sidney Sheldon
"The Other Side of Me", a song by Gotthard from the 2005 album Lipservice